Al-Dujail Sport Club, is an Iraqi football team based in Dujail, Saladin, that plays in Iraq Division Two.

History

Suspension and resumption
In 1982, sporting activities in Dujail were suspended due to the Dujail Massacre. After the year 2003, after the invasion of Iraq, the club's activity resumed and various sports teams were established, including the football team.

Managerial history
 Natiq Haddad
 Zahid Abboud
 Ayoub Younes

See also 
 2021–22 Iraq FA Cup

References

External links
 Al-Dujail SC on Goalzz.com
 Iraq Clubs- Foundation Dates

1992 establishments in Iraq
Association football clubs established in 1992
Football clubs in Saladin